The Secret Witness is a 1931 American pre-Code drama film, directed by Thornton Freeland and starring Una Merkel, William Collier Jr. and Zasu Pitts. It is an adaptation of the novel Murder in the Gilded Cage by Sam Spewack. The screenplay concerns a man who is found murdered in his luxury apartment. His neighbors believe that the wrong man has been arrested and set out to solve the crime.

Cast
 Una Merkel as Lois Martin  
 William Collier Jr. as Arthur Jones aka Casey  
 Zasu Pitts as Bella  
 Purnell Pratt as Capt. McGowan  
 Ralf Harolde as Lewis Leroy  
 Clyde Cook as Larson - Building Engineer 
 June Clyde as Tess Jones  
 Nat Pendleton as Gunner - Bodyguard  
 Clarence Muse as Jeff - Building Janitor 
 Hooper Atchley as Herbert 'Bert' Folsom  
 Billy Bletcher as Radio Announcer's Voice  
 Mike Donlin as Mike - Speakeasy Proprietor  
 James Durkin as Detective  
 Greta Granstedt as Moll 
 Henry Hall as Police Commissioner Martin  
 Paul Hurst as Officer Brannigan  
 Rita La Roy as Sylvia Folsom  
 Maston Williams as Contact Detective

References

Bibliography
 Goble, Alan. The Complete Index to Literary Sources in Film. Walter de Gruyter, 1999.

External links
 

1931 films
1931 drama films
American drama films
Films directed by Thornton Freeland
Columbia Pictures films
American black-and-white films
1930s English-language films
1930s American films